Calobatina geometra is a species of stilt-legged flies in the family Micropezidae.

References

Micropezidae
Insects described in 1830
Diptera of North America